Diary of a Lost Woman (German: Das Tagebuch einer Verlorenen) is a 1918 German silent drama film directed by Richard Oswald and starring Erna Morena, Reinhold Schünzel, and Werner Krauss. The rising star Conrad Veidt also appeared. It is now considered a lost film. It was remade at the end of the silent era as Diary of a Lost Girl by Georg Wilhelm Pabst.

Due to the film's over theme of prostitution it had major censorship issues which delayed its release for several months and led to a number of cuts.

The film's sets were designed by the art director August Rinaldi.

Cast
 Erna Morena as Thymian 
 Reinhold Schünzel as Graf Kasimir Osdorff 
 Werner Krauss as Meinert 
 Paul Rehkopf as Geoteball 
 Conrad Veidt as Dr. Julius 
 Max Laurence as Der alte Graf 
 Ilse Wejrmann as Elisabeth Woyens 
 Marga Köhler as Lene Peters 
 Marie von Buelow as Frau Kindermann 
 Clementine Plessner as Tante Frieda

References

Bibliography
 Kreimeier, Klaus. The Ufa Story: A History of Germany's Greatest Film Company, 1918-1945. University of California Press, 1999.
 Soister, John T. Conrad Veidt on Screen: A Comprehensive Illustrated Filmography. McFarland, 2002.

External links

1918 films
Films of the German Empire
German silent feature films
Films directed by Richard Oswald
German drama films
1918 drama films
Films based on German novels
German black-and-white films
Films about prostitution in Germany
Silent drama films
1910s German films